The Uduk are a Nilo-Saharan group from eastern Sudan. They call themselves Kwanim Pa and are culturally and linguistically related to neighboring communities, such as the Gumuz and the Kwama from the Sudan-Ethiopia borderland. Due to the recent war in southern Sudan they have been forced to emigrate to other countries, especially Ethiopia. Following the peace agreement in 2005, some Uduk have started to return home.
 
The Uduk adhere to their traditional religion along with Christianity or Islam which incorporates traditional beliefs and practices.

References 

 James, Wendy. 1979. `Kwanim Pa: The making of the Uduk people. Clarendon Press, Oxford. 
 Sudan Update

Ethnic groups in Sudan